The 1954 NCAA Swimming and Diving Championships were contested in March 1954 at Webster Pool at Syracuse University in Syracuse, New York at the 18th annual NCAA-sanctioned swim meet to determine the team and individual national champions of men's collegiate swimming and diving in the United States. 

Ohio State returned to the top of the team standings, capturing the Buckeyes' eighth national title.

Team standings
Note: Top 10 only
(H) = Hosts
Full results

See also
List of college swimming and diving teams

References

NCAA Division I Men's Swimming and Diving Championships
NCAA Swimming And Diving Championships
NCAA Swimming And Diving Championships
NCAA Swimming And Diving Championships